Waianiwa is a town and statistical area in the Southland region of the South Island of New Zealand.

Demographics

Waianiwa had a population of 1,170 at the 2018 New Zealand census, an increase of 15 people (1.3%) since the 2013 census, and an increase of 132 people (12.7%) since the 2006 census. There were 417 households. There were 600 males and 570 females, giving a sex ratio of 1.05 males per female. The median age was 36.3 years (compared with 37.4 years nationally), with 276 people (23.6%) aged under 15 years, 210 (17.9%) aged 15 to 29, 588 (50.3%) aged 30 to 64, and 96 (8.2%) aged 65 or older.

Ethnicities were 84.6% European/Pākehā, 8.5% Māori, 0.5% Pacific peoples, 11.5% Asian, and 2.1% other ethnicities (totals add to more than 100% since people could identify with multiple ethnicities).

The proportion of people born overseas was 17.7%, compared with 27.1% nationally.

Although some people objected to giving their religion, 47.7% had no religion, 42.6% were Christian, 1.0% were Hindu, 0.5% were Buddhist and 1.5% had other religions.

Of those at least 15 years old, 147 (16.4%) people had a bachelor or higher degree, and 162 (18.1%) people had no formal qualifications. The median income was $42,000, compared with $31,800 nationally. 171 people (19.1%) earned over $70,000 compared to 17.2% nationally. The employment status of those at least 15 was that 564 (63.1%) people were employed full-time, 165 (18.5%) were part-time, and 15 (1.7%) were unemployed.

Education

References

Populated places in Southland, New Zealand